The U-12 Baseball World Cup is the under-12 baseball world championship sanctioned by the World Baseball Softball Confederation (WBSC) and its predecessor the International Baseball Federation (IBAF), and is the most elite and highest level of competition in its age category. The U-12 Baseball World Championship is scheduled to be held every two years and launched in 2011 in Taipei, Taiwan as the "12U Baseball World Championship".

Unlike other youth international competitions like the Little League World Series, which involve local clubs, the U-12 Baseball World Cup is the only global event across baseball—and all of sport—to feature national teams in this age group (11 to 12 years-old).

The U-12 Baseball World Cup is played under the IBAF's International Rules. Dimensions of regulation U-12 Baseball World Cup ballparks (distance to the outfield fence, pitching mound, base paths, etc.) are significantly increased compared to local youth leagues, due to the superior nature and strength of the players involved.

Because the U-12 Baseball World Cup is considered a "world championship" event, the results of the tournaments affect the WBSC World Rankings.

The inaugural tournament took place in July 2011 and was won by its host Chinese Taipei. The tournament was slated to include 13 national teams and crowned the first ever world champion. Through this tournament, the WBSC looked to assume a leadership position for this age bracket in conjunction with major youth baseball organizations to further develop and promote baseball across the world. The tournament was hosted in Taipei City, one of the prominent tournament venues for international baseball competitions.

Results

1 Republic of China, commonly known as Taiwan, due to complicated relations with People's Republic of China, is recognized by the name Chinese Taipei by most of the international organizations in sports competitions. For more information, please see Cross-Strait relations.
2 Originally scheduled to be held in 2021, but due to the COVID-19 pandemic, postponed to summer 2022.

Medal table

See also
 Baseball awards#World
 Little League World Series, an annual U12-baseball tournament held in Williamsport, Pennsylvania with some level of international participation (8 USA Divisions, 8 International Divisions).
 List of sporting events in Taiwan
 U-12 Softball World Cup

References

 
under
International baseball competitions hosted by Taiwan
Youth baseball competitions
World youth sports competitions
Recurring sporting events established in 2011
World Baseball Softball Confederation competitions